"X" is a song by American singer Poppy, released as a single on October 25, 2018. It is the fifth single from her second studio album Am I a Girl? and its fourteenth and final track. The music video was released on November 5. It was the official theme song for NXT TakeOver: Phoenix the following January.

Release
"X" was released on digital streaming platforms as the fifth and final single from Poppy's second studio album Am I a Girl? and was picked as the theme song for WWE's NXT TakeOver: Phoenix event in 2019. The song's acoustic version was released on January 8, 2019.

Music video
The music video for "X" was released on November 5, 2018. This video was inspired by the 1976 film Carrie.

An acoustic version of "X" was released on Poppy's YouTube channel on January 8, 2019 and as a single for download on January 17, 2019.

Composition
"X" explores heavier territory similar to "Play Destroy", her collaboration with Grimes, with Poppy describing both tracks as a new genre called "Poppymetal". "X" features "contradicting verses and melodies", with heavy metal parts in which the singer "begs to be made bloody" and peaceful sections with harmonies where she sings about wanting to "love everyone". The song is in the key of F# minor with a BPM of 114.

Reception
Andy Hill from Gigwise states: "It's a masterpiece. So much packed in – the legit death metal, the retro-horror shoutouts, the note-perfect peace and love hippy interludes. It's her 'Bohemian Rhapsody'. High art for the Ritalin generation."

Anna Fair from Alternative Press states: "While the peaceful verses are accompanied by delightful harmonies and a scene right out of the '60s, the immediate scene following is dark. Heavy metal guitars back Poppy's vocals, and she gets her wish ['please get me bloody']."

Track listings
Digital download and streaming
 "X" – 2:54

Digital download and streaming (acoustic)
 "X" (acoustic) – 2:08

Release history

References

2018 singles
2018 songs
Poppy (entertainer) songs
Songs written by Titanic Sinclair